In 1025 CE, the Chola Emperor Rajendra I launched naval raids on Srivijaya in maritime Southeast Asia, Rajendra's overseas expedition against Srivijaya was a unique event in India's history and its otherwise peaceful relations with the states of Southeast Asia. Several places in present-day Indonesia and Malay Peninsula were invaded by Rajendra I of the Chola dynasty.  The Chola invasion furthered the expansion of Tamil merchant associations such as the Manigramam, Ayyavole and Ainnurruvar into Southeast Asia. The Cholan invasion led to the fall of the Sailendra Dynasty of Srivijaya and the Chola invasion also coincides with return voyage of the great Buddhist scholar Atiśa from Sumatra to India and Tibet in 1025 CE.

Background
Throughout most of their shared history, ancient India and Indonesia enjoyed friendly and peaceful relations, thus making this Indian invasion a unique event in Asian history. In the 9th and 10th centuries, Srivijaya maintained close relations with the Pala Empire in Bengal, and an 860 CE Nalanda inscription records that Maharaja Balaputra of Srivijaya dedicated a monastery at the Nalanda Mahavihara in Pala territory. The relation between Srivijaya and the Chola dynasty of southern India was friendly during the reign of Raja Raja Chola I. In 1006 CE a Srivijayan Maharaja from Sailendra dynasty — king Maravijayattungavarman — constructed the Chudamani Vihara in the port town of Nagapattinam. However, during the reign of Rajendra Chola I the relations deteriorated as the Cholas attacked Srivijayan cities.

The Cholas are known to have benefitted from both piracy and foreign trade. Sometimes Chola seafaring led to outright plunder and conquest as far as Southeast Asia. Srivijaya controlled two major naval choke points (Malacca and the Sunda Strait) and was at that time a major trading empire that possess formidable naval forces. The Malacca Strait's northwest opening was controlled from Kedah on the Malay Peninsula side and from Pannai on the Sumatran side, while Malayu (Jambi) and Palembang controlled its southeast opening and also Sunda Strait. They practiced naval trade monopoly that forced any trade vessels that passed through their waters to call on their ports or otherwise be plundered.

The reasons of this naval expedition are unclear, the historian Nilakanta Sastri suggested that the attack was probably caused by Srivijayan attempts to throw obstacles in the way of the Chola trade with the East (especially China), or more probably, a simple desire on the part of Rajendra to extend his digvijaya to the countries across the sea so well known to his subject at home, and therefore add luster to his crown. Another theory suggests that the reasons for the invasion was probably motivated by geopolitics and diplomatic relations. King Suryavarman I of the Khmer Empire requested aid from Rajendra Chola I of the Chola dynasty against Tambralinga kingdom. After learning of Suryavarman's alliance with Rajendra Chola, the Tambralinga kingdom requested aid from the Srivijaya king Sangrama Vijayatungavarman.

Invasion
 
The Chola invasion against Srivijaya was a swift campaign that left Srivijaya unprepared. Moreover, during this time in the 11th century, the Chola navy had developed strongly, while Srivijaya sea power was relatively weak. To sail from India to the Indonesian archipelago, vessels from India sailed eastward across the Bay of Bengal and called at the ports of Lamuri in Aceh or Kedah in Malay peninsula before entering Strait of Malacca. But the Chola armada sailed directly to the Sumatran west coast. The port of Barus in the west coast of North Sumatra at that time belonged to Tamil trade guilds and served as a port to replenish after crossing the Indian Ocean. The Chola armada, then continued to sail along Sumatra's west coast southward and sailed into Strait of Sunda. The Srivijaya navy guarded Kedah and the surrounding areas on the northwest opening of the Malacca Strait and so were completely unaware that the Chola invasion was coming from the Sunda Strait in the south. The first Srivijayan city that was raided was Palembang, the capital of Srivijaya empire. The unexpected attack led to the Cholas sacking the city and plundering the Kadatuan royal palace and monasteries. The Thanjavur inscription states that Rajendra captured King Sangrama Vijayottunggavarman of Srivijaya and took a large heap of treasures including the Vidhyadara Torana, the jeweled 'war gate' of Srivijaya, adorned with great splendor.

The Chola invasion did not result in Chola administration over the defeated cities, as the armies moved fast and plundered the Srivijayan cities. The Chola armada seems to have taken advantage of the Southeast Asian monsoon for moving from one port to another swiftly. The tactic of a fast-moving unexpected attack was probably the secret of Cholan success, since it did not allow the Srivijayan mandala to prepare their defenses, reorganize themselves, provide assistance or to retaliate. The war ended with a victory for the Cholas and major losses for the Srivijaya Empire, thus ending their maritime monopoly in the region.

Aftermath

With the Maharaja Sangrama Vijayottunggavarman imprisoned and most of its cities destroyed, the leaderless Srivijaya mandala entered a period of chaos and confusion. The invasion marked the end of the Sailendra dynasty. According to the 15th-century Malay Annals, Rajendra Chola I after the successful naval raid in 1025 CE married Onang Kiu, the daughter of Sangrama Vijayottunggavarman. This invasion forced Srivijaya to make peace with Javanese kingdom of Kahuripan. The peace deal was brokered by the exiled daughter of Sangrama Vijayottunggavarman, a Srivijayan princess who managed to escape the destruction of Palembang and came to the court of King Airlangga in East Java. She also became the queen consort of Airlangga named Dharmaprasadottungadevi and in 1035 CE, Airlangga constructed a Buddhist monastery named Srivijayasrama dedicated to his queen consort.

Despite the devastation, Srivijaya mandala still survived as the Chola invasion ultimately failed to install direct administration over Srivijaya, since the invasion was short and only meant to plunder. Nevertheless, this invasion gravely weakened the Srivijayan hegemony and enabled the formation of regional kingdoms like Kahuripan and its successor, Kediri in Java based on agriculture rather than coastal and long-distance trade. Sri Deva was enthroned as the new king and the trading activities resumed. He sent an embassy to the court of China in 1028 CE. Although the invasion was not followed by direct Cholan occupation and the region was unchanged geographically, there were huge consequences in trade. Tamil traders encroached on the Srivijayan realm traditionally controlled by Malay traders and the Tamil guilds' influence increased on the Malay Peninsula and north coast of Sumatra.

With the growing presence of Tamil guilds in the region, relations improved between Srivijaya and the Cholas. Chola nobles were accepted in Srivijaya court and in 1067 CE, a Chola prince named Divakara or Devakala was sent as a Srivijayan ambassador to the Imperial Court of China. The prince who was the nephew of Rajendra Chola later was enthroned in 1070 CE as Kulothunga Chola I. Later during the Kedah rebellion, Srivijaya asked the Cholas for help. In 1068 CE, Virarajendra Chola launched a naval raid to help Srivijaya reclaim Kedah. Virarajendra reinstated the Kedah king at the request of the Srivijayan Maharaja and Kedah accepted the Srivijayan sovereignty.

See also
 Greater India
 Indosphere
 Sanskritisation
 Maritime history of Odisha
 Indian cultural influences in early Philippine polities
 Hinduism in Indonesia
 Hinduism in Malaysia
 Hinduism in Philippines

References

Chola Empire
Srivijaya
History of India
1025 in Asia
11th century in India
Conflicts in 1025
Overseas empires
Invasions by India
Naval battles involving Cholas